SunnyPsyOp (2003) is the second studio album by industrial band ohGr.

Track listing
All songs written by Ogre and Mark Walk.

Note: "PawSee" is a hidden track that begins 23 seconds into track 13.

This is an Enhanced CD, it includes a video for the song "maJiK".

Personnel
Ogre
Mark Walk
Scott Crane – Additional programming
Loki der Quaeler – Additional keyboards
Camille Rose Garcia - Cover artwork

Notes
An endai is a small bench in a Japanese Garden.
The video for "maJiK" features stop motion animation and the following phrase written in a book near the beginning of the video: "Very Soon/Forever More/The Way to Be/Will Be Attached/Forever Matched/Through What U See".  This is most likely a reference to commercialism's grip on pop culture as the video also features parodies of several popular brand logos including GAP, Nike, General Electric and Starbucks.

References 

2003 albums
OhGr albums
Spitfire Records albums